Kaiser is a short animated film, directed by the cartoonist Álvaro Marins, the Seth, in 1917. It is considered the first cartoon produced in Brazil.

The film premiered on January 22, 1917, at Cine Pathé in Rio de Janeiro, months before Brazil declared war on Germany and started its participation in World War I. It consisted of a political cartoon, showing the emperor Wilhelm II putting on his head a helmet that represented the control over the world. Then, a terrestrial globe grew and swallowed the German leader.

Since 1907 the Brazilian cinemas already presented/displayed animated vignettes in the closure of the newsreels. However, Kaiser was the first Brazilian autonomous animation to be shown. The whereabouts of the work were already unknown 20 years after its release.

The film was not preserved and is now a lost film, leaving only a still frame.

Legacy
Unfortunately, the film was not preserved and was lost forever, leaving only a reference image of the work. To honor the artist and his creation, the director of the film Luz, Anima, Ação, Eduardo Calvet, invited 8 Brazilian animators of different techniques: Marão (traditional), Zé Brandão (digital 2D), Still (animation on paper), Pedro Iuá (clay), Marcos Magalhães (animation in film), Diego Akel (pixilation), Fábio Yamaji (light painting) and Rosana Urbes (metalanguage).

It was shown in August at Anima Mundi 2013.

See also
 History of Brazilian animation
 Brazil during World War I

References

History of animation
Lost animated films
Lost Brazilian films
1910s animated short films
Brazilian animated films
1917 animated films
1917 films
1917 short films
1917 lost films
Brazilian short films
Cultural depictions of Wilhelm II
Films about royalty